Kanaka Dasa (1509–1609) was a Haridasa saint and philosopher, popularly called Daasashreshta Kanakadasa (ದಾಸಶ್ರೇಷ್ಠ ಕನಕದಾಸ). He was a renowned composer of Carnatic music, poet, reformer and musician. He is known for his keertanas and ugabhoga, and his compositions in the Kannada language for Carnatic music. Like other Haridasas, he used simple Kannada and native metrical forms for his compositions.

Life
Kanaka Dasa was born into a Kannada Kuruba (shepherd) Hindu family in Baada village, near Bankapura in Karnataka, and was a warrior at the Bankapura fort. He was taught by Srinivasacharya. As a child, he became an expert in "tarka", "vyakaran", and "mimamsa". Based on one of his compositions, it is interpreted that he was seriously injured in battle and took to the practice of chanting the name of Lord Hari. A beggar appeared to Kanaka Dasa, and Kanaka asked who he was.  The beggar responded that Kanaka called to him.  Kanaka Dasa understood the beggar to be Lord Hari (Krishna) Himself. Lord Hari offered to give Kanaka Dasa three wishes.  Lord Hari first asked if Kanaka wanted treasures. Kanaka Dasa refused, but asked for the following, 1) To be healed of all his injuries, 2) For Lord Hari to appear whenever Kanaka Dasa called for Him, and 3) To give darshan in His Original Form. The Lord granted these wishes.  Upon seeing Lord Hari in His Original Form, Kanaka Dasa became mesmerized. After this incident, Kanaka abandoned his profession as a ksatriya (warrior) and devoted himself to composing music, writing literature and explaining philosophy to the people about Sri Hari. His early spiritual works include poems such as "Narasimha Stotra", "Ramadhyana Mantra", and "Mohanatarangini".

In Udupi

Kanaka Dasa had a connection with Udupi as he was the disciple of Vyasatirtha. The priests would not let him enter the mutt, judging him to be a member of lower caste based on his clothes, even though Vyasatirtha asked them to let Kanaka Dasa into the temple.

It is believed that something supernatural happened when Kanaka Dasa was outside the temple, while he waited to for permission to enter.  It is believed that at that time, when Kanaka Dasa was not allowed to have the darshan of the Krishna murti by the Brahmins.  Instead, his hands bound with rope, and he was accused of theft in the temple and beaten.  However, the murti of Lord Krishna turned around to face west, where Kanaka Dasa was facing to give him darshan.
Kanaka Dasa spent only a short time in Udupi.  He used the phrase, "Kagineleya Adikeshava" as his signature referring to the deity of Kaginele.

Writings

Major works
 Nalacharithre (ನಳಚರಿತ್ರೆ)
 Haribhakthisara (ಹರಿಭಕ್ತಿಸಾರ)
 Nrisimhastava (ನೃಸಿಂಹಸ್ತವ)
 Ramadhanyacharithe (ರಾಮಧಾನ್ಯಚರಿತೆ), a rare work on class struggle
 Mohanatarangini (ಮೋಹನತರಂಗಿಣಿ)

Kanakadasa wrote about 240 Carnatic music compositions (kirtane, ugabhogas, padas, and philosophical songs) besides five major works. Around 100 songs in Kannada and 60 songs in English are published in popular books.

Kanakadasa Jayanthi

Kanaka Dasa's birthday is celebrated in Karnataka, particularly in the Kuruba community. In 2008, Government of Karnataka decided to commemorate his birthday as a state festival and declared 15 November a state holiday.

Kanakadasa Palace

During an excavation at Baada, Shiggaon region of Karnataka, the archaeological department found ruins of a fort and a palace which was identified as the magnificent era of Kanaka Dasa (who was earlier called Thimmappa Nayaka). The State Government of Karnataka has built a new fort, palace and idols of Kanaka Dasa and his life scenarios commemorating the religious leader.

Bhakta Kanakadasa Postal Stamp

In 1990, the Government of India honored Kanaka Dasa by releasing a postal stamp in his name.

In popular culture

Kannada actor and singer from the Kannada movie industry Dr. Rajkumar played Kanaka Dasa in the movie Bhakta Kanakadasa and the movie received a good response from the public.

Girish Karnad made a documentary film, Kanaka-Purandara (English, 1988), on the two medieval Bhakti poets of Karnataka.

See also
 Baada, Shiggaon

References

Carnatic composers
Bhakti movement
Indian social reformers
Indian male poets
History of Karnataka
Indian Vaishnavites
People from Haveri district
Kannada people
Haridasa
1509 births
1609 deaths
16th-century Indian poets
Poets from Karnataka
Vijayanagara poets
Scholars of Vijayanagara Empire